Katherine Salant is a journalist and nationally syndicated real estate newspaper columnist, author, and blogger whose most famous column "Housewatch" appeared in The Washington Post in 1994.

Salant grew up in Northern Virginia and received her Bachelor of Arts from Wellesley College. In 1968 she went to Harvard University to study architecture and received a Fulbright scholarship in 1972.

In 1994, Salant began writing a column about the many facets of home owning for The Washington Post called "Housewatch" which has since become syndicated under the name “Your New Home” to over 40 media outlets, some of which include the Los Angeles Times, Chicago Tribune, San Francisco Chronicle, Houston Chronicle, The Denver Post, Miami Herald, Orlando Sentinel, and The Sacramento Bee.

Published works 

 The Brand New House Book
 4 Villages: Architecture in Nepal

Awards and grants 

 Fulbright Scholar, 1972–74
 National Endowment for the Arts Professional Fellow, 1980
 National Endowment for the Arts Design Communication Grant, 1981
 Missouri Lifestyle Journalism Award for Fashion and Design, 1995
 National Association of Real Estate Editors (NAREE), Best Column in 2012 and 2002, and runner up, four times

References

External links 

 Katherine Salant Blog

Wellesley College alumni
Harvard Graduate School of Design alumni
Year of birth missing (living people)
Living people